Clark Dimond (April 19, 1941 - February 19, 2019) was a guitarist, composer, and author who ran the Dimond Studios, a recording company in Colorado's Sangre de Cristo Mountains.

Born into a musical family in 1941, Dimond started playing piano at the age of five, learned the guitar when he was 17 years old and added the banjo at age 30. He attended Grinnell College in Iowa and then moved to New York, where he worked as an editor on True Experience for McFadden-Bartell while writing scripts for Warren Publishing and Web of Horror. In addition to contributions to Castle of Frankenstein, he was an editor for publisher Martin Goodman's magazine For Men Only.

Recordings
Performing in Colorado, Dimond plays bluegrass, Celtic, folk, jazz, classical and rock, and his studio is mainly devoted to recording and producing the work of Colorado musicians. Dimond can be heard playing banjo, keyboard and guitar and reading poetry on Little Orphan Aliens (Good Food Entertainment, 2001), followed by Good Food's Planet O Live and More (2003). He produced the CD Incarnation (American Primitive Records, 1994), featuring actor-vocalist Tucker Smallwood and guitarist Arlen Roth.

Dimond wrote about illustrator Wally Wood for Bhob Stewart's biographical anthology, Against the Grain: Mad Artist Wallace Wood (TwoMorrows, 2003). His essay, "From the Woodwork Out," examines life and art in the Upper West Side where Wood's studio was located during the 1960s, and the book also features his interview, "Geronimo!", with artist John Severin.

Fiction
Fiction by Dimond includes "You Can't Fire Me for Doing My Job" in New Black Mask 7 (1986). When his mystery novel, No-Frills Mystery, was published by Jove Books in 1981, it was described by The New York Times as "a classic of the genre." He collaborated with science fiction novelist Terry Bisson on several stories for Warren Publishing's Creepy and Eerie.

Dimond's role in the Colorado commune counterculture is mentioned in Roberta Price's Huerfano: A Memoir of LIfe in the Counterculture (University of Massachusetts Press, 2004).

Listen to
 Clark Dimond on banjo: Devil's Stairsteps -- "Rattlesnake Bit the Baby" and "Won't It"
 Tucker Smallwood's Incarnation, produced by Dimond

External links
 Clark Dimond interviewed by Richard Arndt
 New Black Mask: Fiction Index
 Space: Above and Beyond
Terry Bisson's "The Primal Ooze, Clark Dimond, and the Kitchen Sink"
 Obituary – Clark Dimond 4-19-1941 ~ 2-19-2019

1941 births
2019 deaths
Grinnell College alumni
American comics writers
American magazine editors
American bluegrass musicians
Record producers from Colorado
Guitarists from Colorado
Place of birth missing